Living in the Circle is the third studio album by Australian country music band Dead Ringer Band. The album was released in June 1997 and became the band's first charting album, peaking at number 86 on the ARIA Charts.

At the ARIA Music Awards of 1997, the album was nominated for the ARIA Award for Best Country Album.

Track listing

Charts

Release history

References

1997 albums
Dead Ringer Band albums